The ouguiya (; sign: UM; code: MRU), at one time spelled "ougiya", is the currency of Mauritania. Each ouguiya constitutes five khoums (meaning "one fifth"). As such it is one of two circulating currencies, along with the Malagasy ariary, whose division units are not based on a power of ten.

The current ouguiya was introduced in 2018, replacing the old ouguiya at a rate of 1 new ouguiya = 10 old ouguiya, which in turn replaced the CFA franc at a rate of 1 old ouguiya = 5 francs.
The name ouguiya is the Hassaniya Arabic pronunciation of uqiyyah ), meaning "ounce".

First Ouguiya (MRO)

Coins
This was the only year that the khoums was minted, as the ouguiya was worth five CFA Francs a khoums was the equivalent of the franc (which had no subdivision). The most recent issues were in 2003 (1 ouguiya) and 2004 (other denominations). Coins are minted at the Kremnica mint in Slovakia. The coinage slightly changed in 2009, with a reduced 1 ouguiya in plated composition and a bi-metallic 20 ouguiya issued. A bi-metallic 50 ouguiya was issued December 2010.

Banknotes
In 1973, notes were issued by the Central Bank of Mauritania (Banque Centrale de Mauritanie) in denominations of 100, 200 and 1,000 ouguiya. In 1974, a second series of notes was issued in the same denominations, with 500-ouguiya notes added in 1979. Banknotes have been printed by Giesecke & Devrient in Munich, starting with the second issue. 

New banknotes and new coins were introduced in 2004. These notes have completely new fronts and the vignettes on the backs have been redesigned to accommodate the reduction in size. The 2,000-ouguiya denomination is entirely new.

All but the 100 and 200 ouguiya notes have the denomination expressed in Arabic numerals in a holographic patch at right front. The serial numbers for all denominations now appear horizontally at upper left and lower center, and vertically at far right, all formatted with a 2-character prefix, 7-digit serial number, and 1-character suffix.

An entirely new 5,000-ouguiya denomination dated 28.11.2009 was introduced on 8 August 2010, followed by a redesigned 2,000-ouguiya note dated 28.11.2011 issued on 1 February 2012.

Second ouguiya (MRU)
On December 5, 2017, the Central Bank of Mauritania announced a redenomination of its currency at a rate of 1:10. As part of the redenomination, a new series of coins were issued in denominations of 1 khoums ( ouguiya), 1, 5, 10 and 20 ouguiya, with the latter being struck as a tri-metallic coin and a new series of banknotes in denominations of 50, 100, 200, 500 and 1,000 ouguiya. The new ouguiya banknotes issued for the redenomination are printed entirely in polymer.  As a consequence of this change, the ISO Currency Codes for the ouguiya were amended to MRU / 929 and the existing codes of MRO / 478 were retired as per ISO 4217 Amendment Number 165 dated 14 Dec 2017. A 2 ouguiya coin was issued into circulation in 2018, serving as an intermediate denomination for the 1 and 5 ouguiya coins already in circulation. On November 28, 2021, the Central Bank of Mauritania issued a 20 ouguiya banknote, co-circulating with the coin of the same denomination in circulation.

See also
 Economy of Mauritania

References

External links

banknotenews.com

Circulating currencies
Currencies introduced in 1973
Economy of Mauritania